Curt Schreiner (born March 9, 1967) is an American biathlete. He competed at the 1988 Winter Olympics, the 1992 Winter Olympics and the 1994 Winter Olympics.

References

1967 births
Living people
American male biathletes
Olympic biathletes of the United States
Biathletes at the 1988 Winter Olympics
Biathletes at the 1992 Winter Olympics
Biathletes at the 1994 Winter Olympics
Sportspeople from Albany, New York
20th-century American people